Ark (also Romanized as Ārk and Arg) is a village in Khusf Rural District, Central District, Khusf County, South Khorasan Province, Iran. At the 2006 census, its population was 140, in 50 families.

References 

Populated places in Khusf County